Yuri Nesterenko may refer to:
 Yuri Alekseyevich Nesterenko (born 1991), Russian footballer
 Yuri Leonidovich Nesterenko (born 1972), Russian writer
 Yuri Valentinovich Nesterenko (born 1946), Russian mathematician
 Yuri Vladimirovich Nesterenko (born 1956), Soviet football player and Russian coach